The Yale Alumni Magazine is an alumni magazine about Yale University. It was founded in 1891. 

The Magazines statement of purpose approved on June 16, 2003 says:

Yale University took over operations of the Yale Alumni Magazine in 2015. As of July 2015 the editor-in-chief was Kathrin Day Lassila.

References

External links
 Official site

1891 establishments in Connecticut
Alumni magazines
Bimonthly magazines published in the United States
Magazines established in 1891
Yale University publications
Magazines published in Connecticut
Mass media in New Haven, Connecticut